Anthony Paulo Rodrigues Correia (born 6 September 1999) is a French professional footballer who plays for Portuguese club Vilafranquense as a defender. He is the twin brother of Romain Correia who plays for Porto B.

Club career
On 23 July 2021, he signed a two-year contract with Liga Portugal 2 club Estrela da Amadora.

References

External links

1999 births
People from Castres
Sportspeople from Tarn (department)
Footballers from Occitania (administrative region)
French people of Portuguese descent
Living people
French footballers
Association football defenders
Leixões S.C. players
S.C. Braga B players
C.F. Estrela da Amadora players
U.D. Vilafranquense players
Liga Portugal 2 players
Campeonato de Portugal (league) players